"Funny Little Frog" is the first single released from Scottish indie pop band Belle & Sebastian's seventh studio album, The Life Pursuit (2006). The track was released in January 2006 on Rough Trade Records and was produced by Tony Hoffer. The single became the band's highest-charting single in the UK, reaching number 13. The artwork for the single features Julie Coyle and Marisa Privitera. A different version of "Funny Little Frog" appears on Stuart Murdoch's 2009 album God Help the Girl.

Track listings
All songs were written by Belle & Sebastian.

UK CD single
 "Funny Little Frog"
 "Meat and Potatoes"
 "I Took a Long Hard Look"

UK and Australian 7-inch single
 "Funny Little Frog"
 "The Eighth Station of the Cross Kebab House"

UK and Australian DVD single
 "Funny Little Frog" (video)
 "Lazy Line Painter Jane" (live in Glasgow)

Japanese CD single
 "Funny Little Frog"
 "Meat and Potatoes"
 "I Took a Long Hard Look"
 "Funny Little Frog" (video)
 "Lazy Line Painter Jane" (live in Glasgow)

Credits and personnel
Credits are taken from the UK CD single liner notes.

Studios
 Recorded at The Sound Factory (Los Angeles)
 Mixed at Sunset Sound (Los Angeles)
 Mastered at Metropolis (London, England)

Personnel

 James Swinburne – saxophone
 Tony Hoffer – production, mixing, engineering
 Todd Burke – engineering
 Jason Mott – assistant engineering (Sound Factory)
 Chris Reynolds – assistant engineering (Sunset Sound)
 Frank Arkwright – mastering
 Keith Dodds – sleeve design and layout
 Stuart Murdoch – photography
 Patrick Doyle – photography assistance
 Marisa Privitera – photography assistance

Charts

Release history

References

External links
 "Funny Little Frog" at belleandsebastian.com

Belle and Sebastian songs
2006 singles
2006 songs
Rough Trade Records singles
Shock Records singles
Song recordings produced by Tony Hoffer